Gillian O'Sullivan (born 21 August 1976 in Killarney) is an Irish race walker. She set the unofficial world record in the 5000m walk in Belfast, United Kingdom since 2002 however, the IAAF have refused to verify it. She won a silver medal at the world championship in 2003 over 20km. It was the first time since 1995 that an Irish athlete had won a World Championship medal. Six years later in Berlin at the World Championships Olive Loughnane won silver at the same event as O'Sullivan.

O'Sullivan was also the first Irish athlete to win a medal in the walk at an Athletics Championship.  O'Sullivan was one of the main contenders for Ireland to win a medal in the Olympics in Athens in 2004 in the 20 km walk but suffered an injury just before the games that prevented her from taking part. O'Sullivan retired on 19 April 2007 after years of injuries.

She now works as a personal trainer and runs a series of health, fitness and motivation talks in Cork.

Achievements

She attended Lissivigeen N.S

External links
 http://www.gillianosullivan.ie

 http://www.athleticsireland.ie/content/?p=1434#more-1434
 

1976 births
Living people
Irish female racewalkers
Athletes (track and field) at the 2000 Summer Olympics
Olympic athletes of Ireland
Sportspeople from County Kerry
World Athletics Championships medalists